Music from and Inspired by the Motion Picture Waist Deep is the soundtrack to Vondie Curtis-Hall's 2006 film Waist Deep. It was released on June 13, 2006 via Russell Simmons Music Group.

Track listing

Charts

References

2006 soundtrack albums
Hip hop soundtracks
Albums produced by D'Mile
Albums produced by Pete Rock
Albums produced by J. R. Rotem
Def Jam Recordings soundtracks
Albums produced by Bink (record producer)
Drama film soundtracks
Action film soundtracks